National Union of Jute Workers, a trade union of jute mill workers in West Bengal, India. The union is affiliated to the Indian National Trade Union Congress. The general secretary of NUJW is Ganesh Sarkar.

Trade unions in India
Indian National Trade Union Congress
Trade unions of the West Bengal jute mills
Jute industry trade unions
Organizations with year of establishment missing